Delia Vaccarello (7 October 1960 - 27 September 2019) was an Italian journalist and writer, as well as an activist for LGBT rights. She conducted lectures regarding journalism in Bologna and Urbino, and edited columns in the national periodical press related to anti-discrimination issues. A self-declared lesbian, in 2005, she collaborated on a project in the municipality of Venice for citizen education regarding homophobia. For Arnoldo Mondadori Editore, she curated a multi-volume anthology on love between women, the Principesse azzurre ("Blue Princesses").

Biography
Delia Vaccarello was born in Palermo, 7 October 1960. She graduated from Sapienza University of Rome with a degree in philosophy writing her thesis on cultural anthropology.

Since 1990, Vaccarello was associated with the newspaper L'Unità, first, as an employee and, later, as a freelancer. For L'Unità, she edited the page "Uno, due, tre… liberi tutti" ("One, two, three ... free everyone"). She also collaborated with the weekly Il Salvagente for which she edited the column "Il Salvagiovani". From 2010, she was affiliated with Il Fatto Quotidiano, and from May 2013, with the Huffington Post.

In addition to her writing, Vaccarello conducted seminars at the journalism schools in Bologna and Urbino, for which she developed an unpublished course of studies entitled "Media and Prejudices", the latter referring in particular to sexual orientation. From 29 August to 8 September 2007, she was a member of the jury of the first Queer Lion Award at the 64th Venice International Film Festival.

A cancer patient since 2013, Vaccarello died in Palermo on September 27, 2019.

Selected works

Author
 Gli svergognati: vite di gay, lesbiche, trans… storie di tutti, Milan, La Tartaruga, 2003, .
 L'amore secondo noi: ragazzi e ragazze alla ricerca dell'identità, Milan, Mondadori, 2005, .
 Sciò!: giovani, bugie, identità, Milan, Mondadori, 2007, .
 Quando si ama si deve partire, Milan, Mondadori, 2008, .
 Evviva la neve, Milan, Mondadori, 2010, .

Editor

References

1960 births
2019 deaths
20th-century Italian journalists
21st-century Italian journalists
21st-century Italian writers
21st-century Italian women writers
Italian LGBT rights activists
Italian lesbian writers
LGBT history in Italy
Journalists from Palermo
Deaths from cancer in Sicily
Sapienza University of Rome alumni
20th-century Italian women
21st-century Italian LGBT people